Delia Larkin (27 February 1878 – 26 October 1949) was a trade union organiser, journalist and actress, born to Irish parents in Liverpool, England. She was influenced by the activities of her brother, James Larkin, to move to Ireland, and was prominent during the 1913 Dublin Lockout. She was active in Irish trade union activities and was a founding secretary of the Irish Women Workers' Union.

Background

Delia Larkin was born in the Toxteth park district of Liverpool, of Irish immigrants James Larkin and Mary Ann McNulty, both natives of County Armagh. Father James died in 1887 when she was nine years old.

Career

Delia Larkin first became involved with the Irish trade union movement in the summer of 1911. With her help James Larkin founded the Women Workers' Union and Delia became its first general secretary.

Her brother James established a newspaper, The Irish Worker and People's Advocate, as a pro-labour alternative to the capitalist-owned press. This organ was characterised by a campaigning approach and the harsh denunciation of unfair employers and of Larkin's political enemies. She wrote a weekly column for the paper until its suppression by the authorities in 1914. 

In early 1913, James Larkin achieved some notable successes in industrial disputes in Dublin; these involved frequent recourse to sympathetic strikes and blacking (boycotting) of goods. Two major employers, Guinness and the Dublin United Tramway Company, were the main targets of Larkins' organising ambitions. Both had craft unions for skilled workers, but the main aim was to unionise the unskilled workers as well. The resulting industrial dispute was the most severe in Ireland's history. When James Larkin went to England to seek support Delia Larkin took effective charge in Liberty Hall. She formed and ran the entire undertaking to feed the union members and their dependents throughout what became known as the lock-out.

She founded the Irish Workers' Choir in 1912 and set up dance, drama and Irish-language course in Liberty Hall. She also set up the Irish Workers' Dramatic Society in this year. However, in 1914 Delia Larkin was threatened with legal action by Lady Gregory for using her play, The Workhouse Ward, without permission. Delia had hoped to raise money with the play to help victims of the Lockout.

She left Ireland to work as a nurse in England before the 1916 Rising. She returned in 1918. After conflicts with the ITGWU she helped James and another brother Peter found the Workers' Union of Ireland.

She was a committed suffragist and spoke out repeatedly to demand inclusion of female suffrage in the proposed Home Rule Bill.

Personal life and death

In 1921, she married Patrick Colgan, a member of the Irish Citizen Army. When they moved to Ballsbridge, James Larkin joined them and lived out his last years in their flat.

She died at home and is buried in Glasnevin Cemetery.

References

Bibliography
James Larkin, Emmet O'Connor, Cork University Press, Cork, 2002.
Lockout: Dublin 1913, Pádraig Yeates, Gill and Macmillan, Dublin, 2000.
The Rise of the Irish Trade Unions, Andrew Boyd, Anvil Books, Dublin, 1985.

"Dublin Lockout 1913". Patrick Yeates History Ireland Magazine, Vol. 9 No. 2 Summer 2001.

1878 births
1949 deaths
Irish trade unionists
Irish women in politics
People from Toxteth
Burials at Glasnevin Cemetery
Trade unionists from Liverpool